Metanema is a genus of moths in the family Geometridae erected by Achille Guenée in 1857. It contains the following species:

 Metanema bonadea Druce 1892
 Metanema carnaria Packard 1873
 Metanema determinata Walker 1866
 Metanema excavaria Schaus 1901
 Metanema flavida Dognin 1913
 Metanema guatama Schaus 1901
 Metanema inatomaria Guenée 1858
 Metanema lurida Druce 1898
 Metanema margica Schaus 1901
 Metanema santella Schaus 1901
 Metanema simplex Dyar 1938
 Metanema striolata Schaus 1912
 Metanema ugallia Dyar 1912
 Metanema ustinota Prout 1925

References

Hypochrosini